Man of Two Worlds (1986) is a science fiction novel by American writers Brian and Frank Herbert.

Plot summary 

On the distant planet Dreenor lives the most powerful species in the Galaxy. All of the Universe is the creation of the Dreens, who possess the power of "idmaging", turning their thoughts into reality. They can create whole worlds, of which the wild, ungovernable planet Earth is one. But suddenly Earth is a threat, its people on the verge of discovering interstellar travel, and with it, of gaining access to Dreenor itself - a paradox within a paradox, not to be permitted. While the elder Dreens plan Earth's destruction, a youngster, Ryll, embarks on an unauthorized jaunt across space. Forced for survival to merge bodies with an “Earther” whose mind is as strong as his own, he has to battle for control. And the future of all earthly life lies in the hand of a composite being, half wily, aggressive human, half naive adolescent alien, confused and far from home.

Reception
Dave Langford reviewed Man of Two Worlds for White Dwarf #80, and stated that "The combination of tension and daftness (eg, Dreens are helpless against the mind-rotting Earthly herb, basil) makes for an odd read."

Reviews
Review by Peter A. Brigg (1986) in Fantasy Review, June 1986
Review by Ken Lake (1986) in Vector 133
Review by Brian Stableford (1986) in Foundation, #37 Autumn 1986
Review [French] by Thierry Bosch (1987) in Fiction, #392
Review by Helen McNabb (1988) in Paperback Inferno, #70
Review [French] by Jonathan Dornet (1988) in A&A, #113-114
Review by Ken Brown (1988) in Interzone, #23 Spring 1988
Review [German] by Brian Stableford (1990) in Das Science Fiction Jahr Ausgabe 1990

References

1986 American novels
American science fiction novels
G. P. Putnam's Sons books
Novels by Frank Herbert